Junawai is a Block & village panchayat in Budaun district, Uttar Pradesh, India. Its block code is 0172. There are 59 Villages under Junawai tehsil. Junawai is also a village under Junawai block.

References

Villages in Budaun district
Blocks in Budaun District